Nephele oenopion is a moth of the family Sphingidae. It is known from Africa.

The larvae feed on Mussaenda arcuata.

Subspecies
Nephele oenopion oenopion (from Gabon to Tanzania and Kenya and Madagascar)
Nephele oenopion continentis Rothschild & Jordan, 1903 (forests from Sierra Leone to Congo and East Africa)
Nephele oenopion stictica Rothschild & Jordan, 1903 (Comoro Islands)
Nephele oenopion transitoria Turlin, 1996 (Comoro Islands)

References

Nephele (moth)
Moths described in 1824
Moths of Madagascar
Moths of Sub-Saharan Africa
Insects of the Central African Republic
Moths of the Comoros
Moths of Mauritius
Lepidoptera of the Republic of the Congo
Lepidoptera of Gabon
Moths of Réunion